Our Dumb World is a parody of the standard desk atlas created by the staff of The Onion and published by Little, Brown and Company on October 30, 2007. It is The Onion's first book of entirely original content since 1999's Our Dumb Century.

The book, written in the satirical paper's editorial voice, contains entries for nearly every country on Earth, including detailed maps, feature articles, and humorous stereotyped descriptions of regional history and customs. For example, Romania's entry is subtitled, "Bram Stoker's Romania."

There are eight distinct sections of the atlas. In order, North America, South America, Africa, Middle East, Europe, Asia, Oceania, and Extra. Included in the Extra section are the Northern and Southern Poles and Greenland, which is "larger than Africa and South America combined."

The visual style of the book has been compared to Dorling Kindersley's Eyewitness  series. The book uses faux xenophobia to illustrate the cultural differences of various nations, often mocking racial stereotypes with satirical comments. Each section contains "facts" about the nation, a brief history, and other information.

Elements of the book have been transferred to an electronic format available on the paper's website and as a layer on Google Earth. Our Dumb World is also available as an audio book.


Critical reaction
Critical reaction to Our Dumb World has been generally positive with reviewers praising the humor and use of satire.  In the New York Times, William Grimes called it "an astoundingly offensive guide to the states of the union and the countries of the world, compiled on the premise that all countries are ridiculous and contemptible" and found it "sophomoric, transgressive and intermittently brilliant."

See also
 Our Dumb Century

References

External links
 The Onion Store
 Our Dumb World Online
 Wikinews Interview with Onion Editorial Staff
 Newsweek Review

2007 non-fiction books
Parody books
Atlases
The Onion
Little, Brown and Company books